Luino–Oleggio railway is a railway line in Lombardy, Italy.

The railway line was opened on 4 December 1882, in order to provide a second access to the Gotthard railway.

The Novara–Laveno segment was closed to passenger traffic from 12 December 2013. A replacement bus now only serves the section between Sesto Calende and Laveno.

Notes

See also 
 List of railway lines in Italy

External links 

RFI - Fascicolo linea 24

Railway lines in Lombardy
Railway lines in Piedmont
Railway lines opened in 1882
Oleggio